Seni Awa Camara (born c. 1945) is a Senegalese sculptor from the Diola ethnic group. She was born in Bignona, where she still lives and works.  She creates sculptures in clay in her front yard, then fires them in an open-hearth kiln before displaying them around her house.  The pieces, ranging in size from 12 inches tall to 8 feet tall, represent personal symbols.

 She has authorized the use of bronze castings of her work since the terracottas are too delicate to travel.

Camara's work is in The Contemporary African Art Collection (CAAC) of Jean Pigozzi.

Solo exhibitions

 2021. Solo show Art Brussels with Baronian, Brussels (BE)

 2020. "Maternités, Baronian Xippas." Brussels (BE)

 2017. “Art/Afrique, Le nouvel atelier”: African art from 1989 onwards at Fondation Louis Vuitton, Paris

 2011. Seyni Awa Camara entre les éléments, Galeria Kalao, Bilbao (ES)

 2011. Maternités, Baronian Xippas, Brussels (BE) 

 2010. El Vientre de la Tierra, Galeria Kalao, Bilbao (ES)

 2009. Seni Camara & Ndoye Douts, Galerie Nathalie Fiks, Paris (FR)
 2007/2008. Why Africa?Pinacoteca Giovanni e Marella Agnelli, Turin, Italy

 2006/2007. 100% Africa, Guggenheim Museum, Bilbao, Spain
 2005. Arts of Africa, Grimaldi Forum, Monaco, France

 2005. African Art Now : Masterpieces from the Jean Pigozzi Collection, Museum of Fine Art Houston, USA

 2004. Séni Camara, De Crescenzo & Viesti, Rome, Italy

 1990. Séni Camara, Gallery 39, Dakar, Senegal

 1989.  Magiciens de la terre, Centre Pompidou, Paris, France

Group exhibitions
 
 2021. Les restes du bruit, Seyni Awa Camara & Estevão Mucavele, MAGNIN-A, Paris (FR)

 2020. Ex Africa, curated by Philippe Dagen, musée du quai Branly- Jacques Chirac, Paris (FR) 

 2020. Radically Naïve / Naively Radical, ExtraCity, Antwerp (BE)

 2017. Alpha Crucis, curated by André Magnin, Musée Astrup Fearnley, Oslo (NO)

 2016. Art/Afrique : le nouvel atelier _ Les Initiés : sélection d’oeuvres (1989- 2009) de la collection d’art contemporain africain Pigozzi, Fondation Louis Vuitton, Paris (FR)
 2016. Art Paris Art Fair, Grand Palais, Paris (FR)

 2012. Galeristes, Carreau du temple, Paris (FR)

 2011. Figure Libre, Galerie Nathalie Fiks, Paris (FR)

 2009/2010. Chic Art Fair, Galerie Nathalie Fiks, Paris (FR)

 2007/2008. Africa? Una nuova storia, Complesso del Vittoriano, Rome (IT)

 2006/2007. Why Africa?, Pinacoteca Giovanni e Marella Agnelli, Turin (IT)

 2005. 100% Africa, Guggenheim Museum, Bilbao (ES)

 2001. Arts of Africa, Grimaldi Forum, Monaco (FR)

 2001. African Art Now: Masterpieces from the Jean Pigozzi Collection, Museum of Fine Art Houston (US)

 2000. Rocca di Umbertide, Contemporary Art Center (IT)

 2000. Biennale de Venise, 49th édition, Venise (IT)

 1992 - 1991. Il Ritorno Dei Maghi, Orvieto (IT)

 1989. Africa Hoy, Contemporary Art Cultural Center (MX)

 1989. Groninger Museum (NL) The Atlantic Center of Modern Art, Las Palmas de Gran Canary (ES) Senegal Otto-Ritcher-Halle, Galerie des Institutd Für Auslandsbeziehungen Landesmuseum, Oldenburger Kunstverein (DE)

 1989. Magiciens de la Terre, Centre Georges Pompidou, La Grande Halle de la Villette, Paris (FR) 1989

References

1940s births
Living people
Senegalese sculptors
Senegalese women artists
People from Bignona